Dorothea Brande (1893–1948) was an American writer and editor in New York City.

Biography
She was born in Chicago and attended the University of Chicago, the Lewis Institute in Chicago (later merged with Armour Institute of Technology to become Illinois Institute of Technology), and the University of Michigan.  Her book Becoming a Writer, published in 1934, is still in print and offers advice for beginning and sustaining any writing enterprise.  She also wrote Wake Up and Live, published in 1936, which sold more than two million copies.  It was made into the film Wake Up and Live in 1937.

While she was serving as associate editor of The American Review in 1936, she married that journal's owner and editor, Seward Collins.  Collins was a prominent literary figure in New York and a proponent of an American version of fascism; Brande supported many of these ideas in her articles for The American Review.

Dorothea Collins died in New Hampshire.

References

External links 

 Excerpts from her book "Wake Up And Live!"
 'Fascist Sympathies: On Dorothea Brande', The Nation, 13 August 2013

Illinois Institute of Technology alumni
Brande, Dorothea
Brande, Dorothea
Writers from Chicago
American print editors
University of Chicago alumni
University of Michigan alumni
Women print editors